The Rastafari Movement in the United States is the manifestation of the Rastafari Movement, founded in Jamaica, in the United States.

Background 
The name Rastafari is taken from Ras Tafari, the title (Ras) and first name (Tafari Makonnen) of Haile Selassie I before his coronation. In Amharic, Ras, literally "head", is an Ethiopian title equivalent to prince or chief, while the personal given name Täfäri (teferi) means one who is revered. The origin of Rastafari came from Jamaica and Ethiopia. Jah is a Biblical name of God, from a shortened form of Jahweh or Jehovah found in Psalms 68:4 in the King James Version of the Bible. Most adherents see Haile Selassie I as Jah or Jah Rastafari, an incarnation of God the Father, the Second Advent of Christ "the Anointed One", i.e. the Second Coming of Jesus Christ the King to Earth. The Rastafari way of life encompasses the spiritual use of cannabis and the rejection of the degenerate society of materialism, oppression, and sensual pleasures called Babylon. Rastas assert that Zion (i.e., Ethiopia) is a land that Jah promised to them. To achieve this, they reject modern Western society, calling it "Babylon", which they see as entirely corrupt due to materialism and greed. "Babylon" is considered to have been in rebellion against "Earth's Rightful Ruler" (Jah) ever since the days of the Biblical king Nimrod.

The lion is a symbol for Rastafari because it appears on the Imperial Ethiopian flag, used in Haile Selassie I's Ethiopia.

Marcus Garvey 
Marcus Garvey, a native Jamaican, speaking on creating an African state for displaced Africans, told his followers to “look to the East Africa, for the crowning of the Black King." This idea was also to influence the minds of the masses of black people from continuing to worship King George of the United Kingdom.  Marcus Mosiah Garvey referred to Haile Selassie I of Ethiopia, the only remaining African Monarch of Biblical ancestry. However, some found a more literal interpretation. Among some of these were working class Jamaicans, who saw Garvey as a prophet and, more specifically, the reincarnation of John the Baptist. Consequentially, when Ras Tafari of Ethiopia was crowned Emperor Haile Selassie I in 1930, many saw the prophecy fulfilled and proclaimed King Haile Selassie I of Ethiopia Jah, or God.

The movement has had strong cultural, social, and political effects on Ethiopia and Jamaica. Still, to date, little scholarly research has been done on the effects of the movement on the United States of America. However, this is not to say that such influences and affections do not exist in America, which many Rastafari see as the epitome of Babylon and the heart of all evil in the world. This acknowledgement did not stop Rastafari from immigrating to America, as a considerable influx of Jamaican Rastafari made the United States their new home during the 1960s and 1970s. The Rastafari movement played a vital role in the shaping of local United States society and culture, as was seen in the socio-cultural accomplishments of Marcus Garvey, the effects of localized Rastafari community building on the greater metropolitan area, and through the medium of Rastafari riddims, or reggae music. Although some American Rastas believe that the United States is "Babylon", others don't believe that the United States is Babylon. Due to the Revolutionary War against Britain.

Marcus Garvey was one of the most influential elements of the Rastafari Movement in the United States. Marcus Mosiah Garvey Jr. was born into working class Jamaica on 17 August 1887. At 13, Garvey was already learning to influence the masses through an internship at his grandfather's newspaper printing business in Jamaica. It was not long before Garvey began preaching his ideals of Black nationalism and political and economic independence. In 1910, the young prophet began to spread his messages to countries of Latin America, such as Panama and Costa Rica. In 1914, Garvey would find his way to the United States. These ideals would greatly influence American society for generations to come and were seen as a prelude to the Civil Rights Movement.

The Universal Negro Improvement Association 
Foremost, Marcus Garvey sought to organize Black people worldwide, to give them an influential voice in society through overwhelming numbers. To do so, Garvey established the Universal Negro Improvement Association (UNIA), which appealed to Negroes everywhere, calling for them to “reorganize, link up (their) strength, morally, financially, educationally, and physically”. After failed attempts to create a following in Jamaica, Garvey relocated the UNIA to Harlem in New York City, where membership grew rapidly and enthusiastically. By 1920, Garvey had over 2,000,000 members in over 1,000 local chapters of the UNIA.

The UNIA had two principal goals: to establish Black independence politically, and economically. Initially, Garvey came to America to preach his prophecy of Black Nationalism through the Back-to-Africa movement. Under this action, displaced Africans would return to the land of their ancestors, where they would create a prosperous African state and lead Africa to become an influential world power. In 1924, with the financial assistance of the more than 2,000,000 members of the UNIA, Garvey sought to purchase 1 million acres (4000 km²) of land from the African country of Liberia. This land would serve as the place of repatriation Garvey had spoken of for nearly two decades. However, only 11 days after Garvey agreed to purchase the land, Firestone Tires, with the aid of the US government, stole the land from under Garvey's nose. Firestone paid an unprecedented price to purchase what Garvey saw as his land. This was, effectively, the end of the Back-to-Africa movement. Although the movement was a failure, it deeply affected America by showing the power of the Black community, effectively giving them an influential voice within society. It showed that Black people would not stand for white oppression and could organize and fight back against corruption. Overall, the Back-to-Africa movement showed that Black people had the power to pool together and play an active role in political affairs.

The Negro Factories Corporation 
Instituted on January 20, 1920, the Negro Factories Corporation sought to create corporations which would employ only Black people, as well as produce commodities only sold to Black consumers. As Marcus Garvey proclaimed himself: “Negro producers! Negro distributors! Negro Consumers!” Garvey's ideal of an all-Black economy that could eventually supply Black consumers across the globe was not only ambitious but to an extent, also successful. Garvey recommended the creation of independent Black grocery stores, restaurants, laundromats, tailor shops, millinery stores, and publishing houses. The Negro Factories Corporation had vital impact on the United States. It proved to society that Black people were economically able and could operate successfully and independently as businessmen and entrepreneurs. More importantly, it gave Black people initiative, hope, and the secular identity required to prosper in American society.

The Black Star Line 
Marcus Garvey's most famous initiative of Black societal reform came from the institution of the Black Star Line. Created as an offshoot of the Negro Factories Corporation and designed to correlate with the Back-to-Africa movement. Garvey announced the Black Star Line on June 23, 1919. The Black Star Line was created as a shipping company that would link Black communities in America, Jamaica, Canada, Central America, and Africa. Ideally, the Black Star Line would transport Black labored goods, including raw materials and manufactured items, to Black consumers across the globe.

To purchase the company's first ship, and to get the shipping line to the sea, Garvey had to raise $500,000, by selling stocks to only Black people. This economic enterprise was so important to the Black community that over 15,000 spectators came to see the S.S. Fredrick Douglass take sail for its first trip to Jamaica. However, the company eventually folded in 1922, with net losses estimated to be over $1,000,000. But the Black Star Line still had profound effects on America. Allowing blacks to invest in stock was new to the country and thus gave them a modernized way of investing their money. Again, it proved that Black people could thrive as successful businessmen, organize international trades, and contribute economically to America while doing so independently. 

The social and cultural results of the Black Star Line were unheard of in the 1920s and consequently presented Black people with more economic and social opportunities than ever before.

Rastafari community building 
With Rastafaris unable to bring themselves to Zion until the day of repatriation, they decided to bring Zion to their home, which for more and more Rastafaris, was Babylon (the United States). As Jamaican Rastafaris began to immigrate to the United States in the 1960s and 1970s, small, localized, and homogeneous Rastafari communities began to spring up across the country. Such communities appeared in Philadelphia, Boston, Hartford, Miami, Washington D.C., Los Angeles, San Francisco, Chicago, Houston, and most notably, New York City. Specifically, in New York City, six different Rastafari communities exist in five different boroughs. The most influential of these communities are Crown Heights and Bedford-Stuyvesant in Brooklyn.

Generally, the building of localized Rastafari communities occurs through establishing Rastafari community centers, schools, tabernacles, and Rasta cultural stores.

The process 
All Rastafari communities must undergo the community building process, which begins small and grows larger. The initial part of the community consists of tiny Rastafari centers, where Rastas go out of convenience but not necessarily to congregate with other Rastafaris. These centers aim to bring Zion-like elements to their respective Exodus communities. Examples of such centers are smoking yards or weed gates, where Rastafaris go to smoke ganja, or marijuana, which they believe purifies the soul and brings one closer to the Almighty Jah. Other examples of such centers where Rastafaris can purchase Rastafari goods are supermarkets such as ital foods stores, reggae record stores, to specialized medical stores

The second level of community building occurs with the greater organization of Rastafaris into a community. This often coincides with the creation of large churches, which provides the Rastafari with an organized and active community to carry out further Rasta evangelicalism. In Jamaican Rastafari practices, organized congregations are frowned upon, and finding Jah is seen as a personal passageway, but churches are essential for Rasta worship in America. These churches offer various opportunities, including Sunday schools for the youth, “rastalogical” counseling, Ital cooking classes, sewing and knitting, craft building and language instruction courses. Additionally, churches provide public recognition of individual Rastafari, and the movement overall. All for one and one for all.

Localized community building influenced America by introducing the greater metropolitan area to the Rastafari community. American non-Rastas were welcome at Rastafari hangouts, such as dance halls or reggae record stores. By building a community, the individual Rastafari attained a sense of belonging and fellowship. These small pocket societies contributed to the growing diversity of American society and thus helped to further establish America for what it was known: a cultural melting pot.

Reggae 
Reggae was known in Jamaica as a popular dance move until 1968 when the Toots & the Maytals released their single “Do the Reggay”. From this point on, Reggae referred to a genre of music centered on a steady and regular beat played on a rhythm guitar, called the “bang”, and biblical lyrics about Rastafari ideology. In Jamaica and around the world, Reggae, especially Bob Marley's music was used as a medium to bring about social and political change.

This was seen in Zimbabwe’s independence movement in the 1980s, as Bob Marley’s hit song Zimbabwe is today seen as a second national anthem. But what is unique about reggae is that it rarely strays from its Rastafari roots—reggae lyrics have a universal Rastafari theme. Although reggae has not always been as popular in America as in Jamaica, Reggae music has deeply affected American culture through the radio waves and the ways of the Rasta man.

Bob Marley 
Bob Marley was and is reggae music's most transcendent figure. He lived in Delaware briefly before returning to Jamaica to pursue his musical career, which was discernibly influenced by musical genres then popular in the US. Along with his band, the Wailers, Marley became the first international music star to rise to prominence in the 'Third World'. Although Marley was initially very popular in Jamaica for the better part of a decade, with the Wailers being Jamaica's biggest stars for much of that time, it was a slower climb to international fame for both Marley and Reggae music.  The first two 'official' Wailers albums, 'Catch a Fire' and 'Burnin', received great critical acclaim, but sales were less than impressive. However, after the split of the original Wailers and the release of 'Natty Dread' in 1974 as well as the 1975 'Live" album, Marley's music and message began to take hold specifically in England (UK), where Bob Marley and The Wailers' two performances at the Lyceum Ballroom are regarded as two of the most influential concerts ever to take place in that country. In 1976, Bob Marley and The Wailers' "Rastaman Vibration" LP cracked the American charts peaking at #8, producing Marley's only Hot 100 single 'Roots Rock Reggae'. All Marley's follow-up LPs, except "Babylon by Bus", were placed in the US Billboard Top 100. His message only continued to grow, profoundly effecting a large element of American society, specifically white American society. Marley's 'Exodus' released in 1977, is considered his crossover LP placing at #15 and #20 on the Black Albums Chart and Billboard Chart, respectively. Towards the later half of Bob Marley's career, his message began to pick up steam in America's black community, a segment of US society that had long remained impervious to the impact of Bob Marley and Reggae music. However, a series of legendary shows at Harlem's Apollo Theatre in 1979, coupled with the release of the militant Pan-African oriented 'Survival', as well as an appearance at the Amandla Festival in the same year, began to elevate Marley's reputation in the eyes of black America. By the time of Marley's passing in 1981, the Rastafari faith had developed progressively, e.g. in the creation of the 'Twelve Tribes' sect, of which Marley himself was a member. In the US (as in other parts of the world), the music press played a crucial role for Rastafari to be heard, felt and seen. Even though it wasn't fully understood and occasionally mocked or ridiculed, the Rastafari lifestyle was essentially (as far as the western press was concerned) indistinguishable from reggae music.

The Rastafari faith or way of life remains largely misunderstood. However, due to Bob Marley's international reputation in life and his enormous posthumous success, which only continues to grow, the Rastafari movement in the United States has multiplied considerably since Marley died in 1981. The influence of reggae music and its association with Rastafari reached a peak with the success of Rasta artists such as Marley, his wife Rita Marley, Peter Tosh, Dennis Brown, and many others. The reputation of reggae music in general and Bob Marley in particular only continues to gain new respect among younger generations of appreciative fans, and the Rastafari message has, along with this popularity, found its place alongside some of the world's great philosophies and ideologies. Even if Rastafari is not universally embraced, concepts of it are widely accepted and appreciated due largely to the popularity of Bob Marley and reggae music. Marley is considered in many Rasta circles to be a prophet and holds a similar standing with many people throughout the world who do not identify themselves as Rastafari.

See also
Jamaican Americans
Jamaican diaspora

References

Rastafari
Religion in the United States by religion
Jamaican-American history